Shewaki is a village located in the Hindaki area of Afghanistan, in Bagrami District, Kabul Province, near the mountains Koh e Hindaki and Munar e Chakari (not related to Chakari, Afghanistan).

Shewaki is derived from Shiva, the supreme Hindu deity.

Shewaki Stupa 
Shewaki is the site of Shahbahar (King's Vihara), one of Afghanistan's major Hindu temples. Shahbahar was a Buddhist stupa during the Kushans dynasty and a Hindu temple in the time of the Kabul Shahi. It was constructed between the 1st and 3rd centuries CE. In 2022, the reconstruction of Shewaki Stupa finished. The restoration work cost more than $80,000.

Pictures of the ruins of the Shewaki Stupa as Shahbahar or King's Vihara 

 Stupas in Kabul Province
 Shewaki Stupa
 Shewaki Stupa
 Minar e Shewaki

References

Archaeological sites in Afghanistan
Hinduism in Afghanistan
Populated places in Kabul Province